Staines Boat Club is a rowing club between Penton Hook Lock and Bell Weir Lock on the River Thames in England. The club was founded in 1869 when it was first listed in the Rowing Almanac as racing in that season. Its boathouse formally reopened in May 2022 after renovations. It is located next to the Hythe spur of the Thames Path in Egham Hythe, historically also known as Staines hythe, the last word meaning small harbour or river harbour.

Staines has been the organising or support club for Staines Regatta since its inception and predates the rowing clubs on the Putney Embankment listed below. The club was founded in 1851 as an amateur rowing club while a manual-professional distinction applied to the sport, the same early year in the sport as the formal foundation of the club serving Windsor and Eton.  The club has membership groups for different age groups.

Location and amenities
The club and boat house is on the southern bank of the river at Egham Hythe (its electoral ward and parish), close to the Swan Inn on what was a series of three small islands of Staines-upon-Thames before 1754 and remains its post town, it is adjoined by a spur of the Thames Path, the Hythe towpath, through the small riverside conservation area which is connected to the Runnymede towpath, north-west and Staines Bridge which connects it to the Spelthorne towpath, south. It has a small parking and trailer area of hardstanding. The club has a range of regularly updated and improved charitable amenities including boathouses, a large seating area and hire venue.

Remenham club at Henley Royal Regatta
Since 1909 its non-new and multi prize-winning successful oarsmen and women may be invited to join the social Remenham Club which entitles its members and their guests to take part in the only such spectator venue with a clubhouse at Henley Royal Regatta, adjoined by a mound and a large exclusive grass lawn enclosure.  Remenham membership is limited to some of the older rowing clubs along the river.

Establishment
The club was established with select membership criteria, restricted to men in 'professional occupations' and preferably having already learnt to row at a school. The Rowing Almanac has been published every year since 1860. Staines Boat Club first appeared in the Almanac in 1870 which recorded the results of the 1869 season. The club appears in every Rowing Almanac since.

Honours

British champions

See also
Rowing on the River Thames

References

External links
 Official website

Rowing clubs of the River Thames
Remenham Club Founding Clubs
Staines-upon-Thames
1851 establishments in England